KXVV (103.1 FM, "La X 103.1") is a commercial radio station that is licensed to Victorville, California and serves the Victor Valley area. The station is owned by El Dorado Broadcasters and broadcasts a Regional Mexican format. KXVV's studios and transmitter are located in Hesperia. KXVV is also simulcasted on Sister Station KMPS 910 AM

History 
The station signed on August 18, 1980, as KVVQ, a top 40 outlet owned by Kenneth B. Orchard. The call letters were changed to KVVQ-FM in 1985.

In November 1996, William Rice attempted to sell KVVQ-AM-FM to Power Surge Inc., headed by John Power, for $1 million. At the time, KVVQ-FM carried an oldies format. However, the deal fell through. The following February, Rice successfully sold the combo to Tele-Media Communications Corporation for $1.1 million. The new owner changed the call sign to KHDR-FM.

In 2000, Infinity Broadcasting Corporation (predecessor to CBS Radio) acquired KHDR-FM from Tele-Media Broadcasting. Infinity changed the call letters to KVFG and made the station a simulcast of KFRG, a country music station in San Bernardino, California. This lasted until February 16, 2010, when the station flipped to a sports format as an affiliate of ESPN Radio.

On November 15, 2011, KVFG began stunting with Christmas music; the sports format was moved to KRAK in Hesperia, California. On December 26 at 6 a.m., KVFG ended stunting and introduced a classic hits format branded as "103.1 The Route".

On February 2, 2017, CBS Radio announced it would merge with Entercom. The merger was approved on November 9, 2017, and was consummated on November 17.

On May 6, 2019, Entercom sold KVFG and KMPS to El Dorado Broadcasters for $1 million. The sale was completed on August 15, 2019, with the new owners simultaneously changing the station's call sign to KXVV.

On August 26, 2019, at 6 P.M. PST, the station flipped to a Regional Mexican-formatted station branded as "La X 103.1".

References

External links

XVV
XVV
Mass media in San Bernardino County, California
Victor Valley
Hesperia, California
Victorville, California
Radio stations established in 1980
1980 establishments in California
Regional Mexican radio stations in the United States